Zigui County is a county of western Hubei province, People's Republic of China. It is under the administration of the prefecture-level city of Yichang and encompasses the easternmost portion of the Yangtze River Gorges, including the Xiling Gorge.

The county seat of Zigui is now the town of Maoping, situated a few kilometers west of the Three Gorges Dam on the high southern shore of the river. The original Zigui town was upstream to the west and was abandoned and submerged under the rising waters of the reservoir in the early years of the 21st century. As it is common in China, Maoping is typically labelled as "Zigui County" or simply "Zigui" on most maps.

Administrative divisions
Eight towns:

Four townships:
Shuitianba Township, Xietan Township, Meijiahe Township, Moping Township

Climate

Tourism
A good view of the Three Gorges Dam, and of an ancillary dam further south, can be had from Maoping's riverside parks.

Economy
Most of Zigui is hilly or mountainous with basic farming and tea production. There are many small coal mines in the mountains, with the coal trucked to the river then loaded onto barges for shipping downstream.

Transportation

Passenger boats and ferries travelling up and down the river can dock at the large passenger dock ("Zigui Harbor", 秭归港) at Maoping, or at Taipingxi Town on the north bank close to the Dam. Frequent bus service connects Maoping with  the center city of Yichang to the east; there is also bus service to most towns in the county, as well as to the neighboring counties.

External links

References

 
Counties of Hubei
Geography of Yichang